Charles Bernard "Bud" Taylor (July 22, 1903 – March 6, 1962) was an American boxer from Terre Haute, Indiana. Nicknamed the "Blonde Terror of Terre Haute", he held the NBA World Bantamweight Championship during his career in 1927. The Ring Magazine founder Nat Fleischer rated him as the #5 best bantamweight of all-time. Taylor was inducted into the Ring Magazine Hall of Fame in 1986 and the International Boxing Hall of Fame in 2005. Taylor was trained for much of his career by former light heavyweight fighter, Mark "The Flurry" Feider.

Pro boxing career

Tetralogy vs. Memphis Pal Moore
Bud fought prolific pugilist Memphis Pal Moore 4 times. Moore defeated Taylor in their first two encounters, which both took place in Illinois. Their third fight was declared a draw, and in their last meeting, Taylor was finally able to achieve victory by decision. All of their bouts were decided by newspaper decision, with the official verdict being a "no-decision" at the time.

Trilogy vs. Pancho Villa
Taylor would square off against the great Pinoy boxer Pancho Villa in three fights, with the initial bout taking place three months after Villa had dethroned Jimmy Wilde to become the World Flyweight Champion. The first fight he lost by decision in Chicago, later exacting revenge during the rematch in Milwaukee via newspaper decision. The rubber match was awarded to Villa, again by points decision.

He also fought Bushy Graham in two fights. In the first fight he beat Bushy by decision in Illinois. The second fight Taylor lost to Bushy by decision in Long Island City.

Trilogy vs. Jimmy McLarnin
In yet another multi-bout series against a future Hall of Famer, Taylor faced Jimmy McLarnin three times. He bested McLarnin in two out of three encounters via points victories, with a loss by disqualification sandwiched in between. McLarnin would later go on to become the World Welterweight Champion.

Trilogy vs. Tony Canzoneri and NBA bantamweight title
On March 26, 1927 he fought Tony Canzoneri for the vacant NBA bantamweight title. However, the fight went to a draw, and thus promoter Jim Mullen retained the $4,000 diamond-studded championship belt. Taylor would again fight for the title against Canzoneri in a rematch on June 24, 1927, this time winning a unanimous decision at Wrigley Field. He would fight Tony Canzoneri one more time at Madison Square Garden, where he lost by decision in a non-title fight.

Taylor held the NBA bantamweight title until May 18, 1928, when the NBA stripped him of it after he had begun fighting in the heavier, featherweight class.

Professional boxing record
All information in this section is derived from BoxRec, unless otherwise stated.

Official record

All newspaper decisions are officially regarded as “no decision” bouts and are not counted in the win/loss/draw column.

Unofficial record

Record with the inclusion of newspaper decisions in the win/loss/draw column.

References

External links
 
 BoxRec Biography - Bud Taylor

|-

 

1903 births
1962 deaths
Boxers from Indiana
International Boxing Hall of Fame inductees
Sportspeople from Terre Haute, Indiana
American male boxers
Bantamweight boxers